Daboh is a town and a nagar panchayat in Bhind district  in the state of Madhya Pradesh, India.

Geography
It has an average elevation of 161 metres (528 feet).

Demographics
 Indian census, Daboh had a population of 15,897. Males constitute 54% of the population and females 46%. Daboh has an average literacy rate of 60%, higher than the national average of 59.5%: male literacy is 72% and female literacy is 47%. In Daboh, 17% of the population is under 6 years of age.

References

Cities and towns in Bhind district